The Paraavis Ivengo is a Russian single-place paraglider that was designed and produced by Paraavis of Moscow. It is now out of production.

Design and development
The Ivengo was designed as an intermediate glider.

Variants
Ivengo 28
Small-sized model for lighter pilots. The glider model is AFNOR Standard certified.
Ivengo 30
Large-sized model for heavier pilots. The glider model is AFNOR Standard certified.

Specifications (Ivengo 28)

References

Ivengo
Paragliders